Julie May Peasgood (born 28 May 1956 in Cleethorpes, Lincolnshire) is an English actress, television presenter, author and voiceover artist known for her distinctive voice.

She is best known for her role as Fran Pearson in the television soap Brookside (1991–93). She later played Jo Steadman in Emmerdale in 1997 and Jacqui Hudson in Hollyoaks from 2001 to 2002.

Biography
Peasgood was born to working-class parents from Northern England. Her mother had started work as a tightrope walker and juggler in Bertram Mills Circus. There she had met her father, who was a welfare officer for the Grimsby Dock Labour Board. Peasgood was educated at Grimsby's Wintringham School. After leaving school she worked in a fish and chip shop in Cleethorpes before training at the Arts Educational School in Golden Lane, London. She left the school shortly before her course finished to take the title role in 'Cherryripe and the Lugworm Digger', which was the first in the series 'Seven Faces of Woman' for ITV.

She is the mother of the actress Kate McEnery by her first marriage to Peter McEnery, whom she acted opposite in Ron Daniel's Royal Shakespeare Company production of Pericles in 1979. She has been married since 1998 to actor Patrick Pearson.  Her niece, Emily Peasgood, is an Ivors Composers Awards winning composer and sound artist.

Acting career

Peasgood was with the RSC for five years, where she played the role of Tilda (Matilda) Price in the original production of Nicholas Nickleby directed by Trevor Nunn. She was also in the production of Inadmissible Evidence, directed by John Osborne at the Royal Court, and has performed at the Old Vic, the Royal Exchange Theatre, Manchester, the Orange Tree and the West End.

On television she is probably most recognised for the roles of Fran Pearson in Brookside and Jo Steadman in Emmerdale. However, she has appeared in numerous other television series. Among her other credits include appearances in Hollyoaks where she played Jacqui Hudson, First Born, September Song, Taggart, A Woman's Guide to Adultery, Cherryripe and the Lugworm Digger, Carla Lane's Luv, Doctors, The Bill,  Holby City, 4 Play, Spender, Ruth Rendell's Simisola, Dancers, This Year, Next Year, the original 1970s series of Survivors, Boon and Small World.

She appeared in the 1983 horror film House of the Long Shadows, which starred Peter Cushing, Vincent Price and Christopher Lee.  In 1985 she featured in the dialogue-free television comedy seriesThe Optimist.

She started to do voice overs in the 1980s, and has voiced several hundred television and radio commercials. She is perhaps most well known in this role for a 1990s advert for Bird's Eye Frozen Peas. In 2003, Peasgood was known as the "queen of the ad voice overs".

On radio she has appeared in Galton and Simpson's Impasse on BBC Radio 2, in which she played Mrs Spooner, opposite Mitchell and Webb. She also played the leading role of Shirley in Venus to Go on BBC Radio 4.

Presenting career
Peasgood is also a TV presenter, and won the Royal Television Society's TV Personality of the Year Award in 2004, for her series Great Little Breaks. Other credits include Bootsale Challenge, Loose Women, This Morning, Wish You Were Here...?, The Alan Titchmarsh Show, Turf Wars on UKTV Style,A Buyer's Guide to Spain on Real Estate TV which she wrote, directed and presented with her husband actor Patrick Pearson, and Crafty Beggars for TLC which she co-produced and co-presented with business partner Wendy Turner Webster (sister of TV personality Anthea Turner) being the first venture for their company Good Turn Productions.

Other work
She contributed a vocal performance to Creative Reality's survival horror videogame Martian Gothic: Unification which was released in 2000. She later spoke out against violent video games, emphasising their negative effects, and attracted some criticism due to her contribution to Martian Gothic.

Her first book, The Greatest Sex Tips in the World, was launched at the London Book Fair on 16 April 2007 and went on to earn her Best Sex Writer Award from Scarlet Magazine. She currently has two regular magazine columns, is Contributing Editor of Cruise International magazine and writes about travel for a number of newspapers, magazines and websites.

Peasgood is also a public speaker and events host.

Filmography

Film

Television

References

External links
Julie Peasgood's official website
 

1956 births
Living people
People from Grimsby
People educated at the Arts Educational Schools
English television actresses
English soap opera actresses
English film actresses
English radio actresses
English television presenters
English writers
English women writers